Mike Burnett (born 6 October 1988) is an English former professional rugby league footballer who played in the 2000s and 2010s for Hull F.C. and the Harlequins RL in the Super League.

Background
Burnett was born in Kingston upon Hull, Humberside, England.

Career
He was forced to retire from rugby league in 2012 due to a back injury.

References

External links
Profile at hullfc.com
Burnett boost for Harlequins RL
 (archived by web.archive.org) Stats → PastPlayers → B at hullfc.com
 (archived by web.archive.org) Statistics I at hullfc.com
 (archived by web.archive.org) Statistics II at hullfc.com

1988 births
Living people
English rugby league players
Hull F.C. players
London Broncos players
Rugby league players from Kingston upon Hull
Rugby league second-rows